is a Japanese former professional racing cyclist. He retired at the end of the 2008 season. His brother, Shinichi Fukushima, is also a professional cyclist.

Career highlights

 2003: 3rd in General Classification GP Chantal Biya (Cameroon)
 2003: 3rd in Stage 2 Tour de Taiwan, Taitung (Taiwan)
 2003: 2nd in Stage 5 Tour de Taiwan, Shih Kang Dam (Taiwan)
 2004: 1st in Stage 3 Paths of King Nikola, Kotor
 2004: 1st in Stage 1 Ronde van Servië, Banja Koviljaca (Loznica) (Serbia)
 2004: 1st in General Classification Ronde van Servië (Serbia)
 2004: 2nd in Stage 1 Tour of China, Beijing (China)
 2004: 1st in Stage 3 Tour of China, Beijing (China)
 2004: 1st in General Classification Tour of China (China)
 2005: 1st in Prologue Tour of Siam, Chiang Mai (Thailand)
 2005: 2nd in Stage 1 Tour of Siam, Phrae (Thailand)
 2005: 1st in Stage 3 Le Tour de Langkawi, Tanah Merah (Malaysia)
 2005: 1st in Best Asian Riders Classifications (Blue Jersey) Le Tour de Langkawi (Malaysia)
 2005: 3rd in Stage 1 Circuit de Lorraine, Nancy (France)
 2005: 2nd in General Classification Circuit de Lorraine (France)
 2006: 2nd in Stage 1 Tour of Siam, Bangkok circuit (Thailand)
 2006: 3rd in Stage 2 Tour of Siam, Prachuap Khiri Khan (Thailand)
 2006: 1st in General Classification Boucles de la Mayenne (France)
 2006: 3rd in Stage 4 Tour d'Indonesia, Solo (Indonesia)
 2007: 1st in Stage 2 Tour of Siam, Si Nakharindra Dam (Thailand)

External links

1973 births
Living people
Japanese male cyclists